José de la Cruz Guzmán (born March 5, 1963) is a former Venezuelan boxer, competing in the welterweight division.

Guzman competed for his native country at the 1992 Summer Olympics in Barcelona, Spain, where he was defeated in the first round of the Men's Welterweight (– 67 kg) by Kenya's Nicodemus Odore. A year earlier he captured the bronze medal in the same division at the 1991 Pan American Games.

References

Sports Reference.com profile - ? no other sources found

1963 births
Living people
Welterweight boxers
Olympic boxers of Venezuela
Pan American Games bronze medalists for Venezuela
Boxers at the 1991 Pan American Games
Boxers at the 1992 Summer Olympics
Venezuelan male boxers
Pan American Games medalists in boxing
Central American and Caribbean Games bronze medalists for Venezuela
Competitors at the 1990 Central American and Caribbean Games
Central American and Caribbean Games medalists in boxing
Medalists at the 1991 Pan American Games
20th-century Venezuelan people
21st-century Venezuelan people